The Caernarfon Deanery is a Roman Catholic deanery in the Diocese of Wrexham that covers several churches in Caernarfon and the surrounding area in Gwynedd and Anglesey.

The dean is centred at St Mary's Church in Holyhead, where on the island of Anglesey all the Catholic churches are served by the Oblates of Mary Immaculate.

Churches

Anglesey
 Our Lady Star of the Sea and St Winefride, Amlwch
 Our Lady of Lourdes, Benllech - served from Amlwch
 St David, Cemaes Bay - served from Amlwch
 Our Lady Queen of Martyrs, Beaumaris
 St Joseph, Llangefni - served from Beaumaris
 St Anne, Menai Bridge - served from Beaumaris
 St Mary Help of Christians, Holyhead
 St Therese, Rhosneigr, Holyhead - served from Holyhead

Gwynedd
 Our Lady and St James, Bangor
 St Pius X and St Richard Gwyn, Bethesda - served from Bangor
 St David and St Helen, Caernarfon
 St John Jones, Llanberis - served from Caernarfon
 Our Lady and St Cynfil, Penrhos
 St Joseph, Pwllheli
 St Garmon, Abersoch - served from Pwllheli

Gallery

References

External links
 Catholic Anglesey site
 St Joseph's Parish Pwllheli site
 St Garmon Church site

Roman Catholic Deaneries in the Diocese of Wrexham